Mastermind is a 1976 Japanese-American comedy thriller film directed by Alex March and starring Zero Mostel, Keiko Kishi and Gawn Grainger. Filmed in 1969, it sat on the shelf for seven years before receiving a limited theatrical release in 1976. It has developed a cult following since  its release on home video.

The second of producer Malcolm Stuart's two-picture deal with screenwriter, William Peter Blatty, the project was inspired by the success of the 1964 Peter Sellers comedy A Shot in the Dark which Blatty had co-written with producer/director Blake Edwards. Blatty's script was drastically revised by Ian McLellan Hunter prior to production, and the disgruntled screenwriter chose the pseudonym Terence Clyne for his screen credit. By 1973 it had recorded a loss of $2.9 million. Blatty's original screenplay was published as part of a limited edition collection by Lonely Road Books in 2013 as Five Lost Screenplays by William Peter Blatty.

Plot
Zero Mostel plays an inspector on the trail of criminals who have captured a robot called Schatzi played by Felix Sillas. The inspector has delusions that
he is a great Samurai warrior and the film flashes back and forth between present day and ancient times.

Cast
 Zero Mostel as Inspector Hoku Ichihara
 Keiko Kishi as Nikki Kono
 Gawn Grainger	as Nigel Crouchback
 Bradford Dillman as Jabez Link
 Jules Munshin as Israeli Agent #1
 Furankî Sakai	as Captain Yamada (as Frankie Sakai)
 Sorrell Booke	as Max Engstrom
 Zaldy Zshornack as Officer Abe
 Felix Silla as Schatzi
 Phil Leeds as Israeli Agent #2
 Kichi Taki as The Monk
 Tetsu Nakamura as Mr. Hiruta (as Satoshi Nakamura)
 Chikako Natsumi as Yoko Hara
 Larry Ohashi as Police Commissioner
 Masanobu Wada as Hori 
 Wataru Omae as Kozo (as Kin Omae)
 Renate Mannhardt as Bertha Tors

References

External links

1976 films
1970s parody films
1970s mystery films
American parody films
Comedy mystery films
Films scored by Fred Karlin
Films set in Japan
1976 comedy films
Japan in non-Japanese culture
1970s English-language films
1970s American films